The sand gerbil (Gerbillus syrticus) is distributed mainly in northeastern Libya. Less than 250 individuals are thought to be left in existence. It is sometimes considered a subspecies of the pygmy gerbil.

References

  Database entry includes a brief justification of why this species is listed as data deficient

Gerbillus
Rodents of North Africa
Endemic fauna of Libya
Mammals described in 1974